Paul Francis Leibold (December 22, 1914 – June 1, 1972) was an American clergyman of the Roman Catholic Church.   He served as archbishop of the Archdiocese of Cincinnati in Ohio from 1969 until his death in 1972.

Leibold previously served as bishop of the Diocese of Evansville in Indiana from 1966 to 1969 and as an auxiliary bishop of the Archdiocese of Cincinnati from 1958 to 1966.

Biography

Early life 
Paul Leibold was born on December 22, 1914, in Dayton, Ohio, to Frank and Philomena (née Kirchner) Leibold. He attended Holy Trinity primary school and Chaminade High School, both in Dayton.  Leibold then spent two years of college at the University of Dayton.  After deciding to enter the priesthood, he entered St. Gregory Seminary, then finished his preparation at Mount St. Mary's Seminary in Cincinnati

Priesthood 
Leibold was ordained a priest for the Archdiocese of Cincinnati on May 18, 1940, by Archbishop John T. McNicholas.  He served as pastor of St. Louis Parish in Cincinnati, and assistant chancellor and chancellor for the archdiocese.

In the late 1950's, Leibold became the spiritual advisor for Mildred Ephrem Neuzil, a nun from Our Lady of the Nativity Convent in New Riegel, Ohio.  Between 1956 and 1959, Neuzil reported that Mary, mother of Jesus, had appeared to her on several occasions and proclaimed herself as the "Lady of America".  According to Neuzil, the apparitions gave her a message calling for Americans to return to purity.  Leibold gave his approval for private devotion to Our Lady and allowed the striking of a medal to honor her.

Auxiliary Bishop of Cincinnati 
On April 10, 1958, Leibold was appointed as titular bishop of Trebenna and as auxiliary bishop of the Archdiocese of Cincinnati by Pope John XXXIII.  Leibold was consecrated on June 17, 1958, by Archbishop Karl Joseph Alter.

Bishop of Evansville 
On April 4, 1966,  Leibold was appointed by Pope Paul VI as bishop of the Diocese of Evansville. He was installed on June 15, 1966.

Archbishop of Cincinnati 
Pope Paul VI appointed Leibold as the sixth archbishop of the Archdiocese of Cincinnati on July 23, 1969. He was installed on October 2, 1969. One historian has characterized Leibold as "both a warm-hearted, approachable pastor and a hard-worker." Leibold strengthened the Priests' Senate, the Pastoral Council, and the parish councils of the archdiocese. He also launched the archdiocese's sixth synod, Synod '71.

As archbishop, Leibold allowed the publication of two pamphlets about the Neuzil apparitions.  He also commissioned a wooden plaque with an image of Our Lady of America for display at the New Riegel convent. In September 1971, Leibold criticized composer Leonard Bernstein's theatrical work Mass, terming it as offensive.

Death and legacy 
Paul Leibold died at Good Samaritan Hospital in Cincinnati on June 1, 1972 after suffering a stroke that day.  He is buried at Gate of Heaven Cemetery in Cincinnati, Ohio. The Bishop Leibold School in  Miamisburg, Ohio, and the Archbishop Leibold Home for the Aged in Cincinnati are named for him.

In 2020, the US Conference of Catholic Bishops commissioned a panel of five bishops to investigate the Neuzil apparitions.  The panel concluded that her apparitions were not supernatural in nature and that public devotion to them was not appropriate.

References

External links
Succession of Archbishop Paul Francis Leibold
Bishop Leibold School Official Website

1914 births
1972 deaths
American people of German descent
The Athenaeum of Ohio alumni
University of Dayton alumni
Roman Catholic archbishops of Cincinnati
Roman Catholic bishops of Evansville
Participants in the Second Vatican Council
People from Dayton, Ohio
20th-century Roman Catholic archbishops in the United States